The Museum of Sierra Ski History and 1960 Winter Olympics, located in Tahoe City, California, is focused on the heritage of skiing in the Sierra Nevada mountains of California and Nevada.  

The museum's exhibits include photos and memorabilia about the history of skiing up through the 1960 Winter Olympics, which were held in nearby Squaw Valley, California.  Displays include ski equipment, posters, trophies, clothing and local athlete profiles. Official Olympic items include skis, racing bibs, official results, and promotional literature. Olympic participation mementos include exhibited banners, souvenirs and spectator memorabilia.  There are also conceptual drawings prepared by Walt Disney for the planning of the Games.

The ski history displays are on the second floor of the Gatekeepers Museum in Tahoe City, CA. North Lake Tahoe Historical Society is hosting the Sierra Ski History displays for the next few years.

External links
 Museum of Sierra Ski History and 1960 Winter Olympics

References

Museums in Placer County, California
Sports museums in California
Ski museums and halls of fame
Olympic museums